Walkeringham  is a village and civil parish in Nottinghamshire, England. According to the 2001 census it had a population of 908, increasing to 1,022 at the 2011 census. The parish church of St Mary Magdalen is 13th century. It has one public house: The Fox and Hounds.

Southmoor lodge, employs 29 local people to care for 40 older peoples. It also has a former station house (now a private residence) and a level crossing across Station Road. The end of Station Road is cut off by the River Trent. Walkeringham's housing was extended in the mid-1960s to accommodate the workers of West Burton Power Station. The village also has a small school, which has recently been extended with a new hall (2010).

Toponymy
, + hām (Old English) a village, a village community, a manor, an estate, a homestead., etc, so possibly ‘village of the people of a man called Walhhere.

Walkeringham appears in the Domesday survey of 1086 as Wacheringeham  and as Wacheringham.

References

External links

Villages in Nottinghamshire
Civil parishes in Nottinghamshire
Bassetlaw District